Gradski Stadion is a multi-use stadium in Sisak, Croatia. It serves as home stadium for football club HNK Segesta. The stadium all seating capacity is 8,000 spectators.

External links
 Stadium information

Football venues in Croatia
HNK Segesta
Buildings and structures in Sisak-Moslavina County